Eucephalus glaucescens is a North American species of flowering plant in the family Asteraceae known by the common name Klickitat aster. It grows on rocky slopes and in subalpine meadows at high elevations on and near Mount Adams in the south-central part of the US State of Washington.

Stems are hairless. Leaves are whitish and waxy. One plant will usually produce 5-60 flower heads in a large array. Each head has 8-13 purple ray florets surrounding numerous yellow  disc florets.

References

External links
photo of herbarium specimen at Missouri Botanical Garden, collected in Washington in 1883, probable type material for Aster engelmannii var. glaucescens/Eucephalus glaucescens
Paul Slichter, Members of the Sunflower Family with Daisy- or Sunflower-like Flower Heads, Klickitat Aster.  Eucephalus glaucescens photos

Astereae
Flora of Washington (state)
Plants described in 1884